Schaffhauseria is a genus of ammonite from the Upper Hauterivian. Its fossils have been found in Switzerland and France.

References

Fossils of France
Fossils of Switzerland
Hauterivian life
Early Cretaceous ammonites of Europe
Ammonite genera
Ancyloceratoidea